Middleton, previously known as Stringtown, is an unincorporated community in Washington County, Oregon, United States. To improve communication between Portland and Lafayette, a post office was established at Middleton in 1869. A rail station was then established on July 1, 1892, soon before the post office closed, in 1905.
A November 2011 vote for the annexation of portions of Middleton north of Brookman Road by the neighboring incorporated community of Sherwood failed.

References

Unincorporated communities in Washington County, Oregon
1869 establishments in Oregon
Populated places established in 1869
Unincorporated communities in Oregon